Barentu may refer to:
 Barentu, Eritrea, a town
 Barentu Oromo people, a moiety of the Oromo people in Ethiopia